U.S. Route 15 (US 15) is a  U.S. Highway in the eastern part of the U.S. state of South Carolina. It is a north–south highway that travels from Walterboro to the North Carolina state line, north-northeast of McColl.

Route description
Starting at ALT US 17 in Walterboro US 15 runs north as North Jefferies Boulevard, which was previously designated as Alt US 17 until that route turned east onto Wichman Street. It runs parallel to I-95 intersecting with U.S. 78 in St. George and later one of its auxiliary routes U.S. Route 178 before it crosses I-26 at a cloverleaf interchange (Exit 172) in Harleyville. Then it turns northwest, passing through Wells where it not only intersects U.S. Route 176, but the western terminus of South Carolina Highway 45. North of that point it crosses I-95 at Exit 93. Just before the town of Santee US 15 converges with US 301. As the routes turn east, the roadway continues north as US-15 Connector to service Santee. In Santee the two highways merge with I-95 at exit 98 and all three cross Lake Marion. At exit 102, US 15/301 split off from I-95 returning to the former segment of US 15/301, now named St. Paul Road and go into the town of Summerton. US 15 then separates from US 301, remaining on Church Street (while US 301 makes a right turn onto Main Street) and heads mainly north to city of Sumter. From there it continues north, crosses I-20, goes through the cities of Bishopville and Hartsville to the town of Society Hill. It is here that US 401 joins US 15 and both go to the North Carolina border.

History

US 15 was extended south into South Carolina in 1935 as an replacement for the second incarnation of US 401 that existed between 1932-1934, which also existed in North Carolina. Besides being replaced by US 15 part of that route was also replaced by the former US 15A between Sumter and Society Hill.

In 1946 the road ran along a new two-lane bridge over Lake Marion along with US 301 with the potential for a second span that was never built. For a brief period from 1950 to 1951 US 15 was extended south from Walterboro through Yemassee and into Pocotaligo along what is today part of US 17 ALT.

When I-95 was built across Lake Marion in 1968, US 15 and 301 ran parallel to it until they were relocated in a triple concurrency in 1987.

South Carolina Highway 42

South Carolina Highway 42 (SC 42) was an original state highway that was established in 1922 from Sumter to Bishopville. In 1925 or 1926, it was decommissioned and redesignated as SC 30. Today, most of its path is part of US 15.

Major intersections

See also

References

External links

US 15 at Virginia Highways' South Carolina Highways Annex

15
 South Carolina
Transportation in Colleton County, South Carolina
Transportation in Dorchester County, South Carolina
Transportation in Orangeburg County, South Carolina
Transportation in Clarendon County, South Carolina
Transportation in Sumter County, South Carolina
Transportation in Lee County, South Carolina
Transportation in Darlington County, South Carolina
Transportation in Marlboro County, South Carolina